Philip Henry Alston Jr. (April 19, 1911 – March 2, 1988) was an American lawyer and diplomat who served as U.S. Ambassador to Australia and Nauru.

Biography
Alston was born in Atlanta, Georgia, on April 19, 1911 to attorney Philip H. Alston Sr. (1880-1962) and May Lewis Alston (1890-1962). He received a bachelor's degree from the University of Georgia in 1932, and earned a law degree from Emory University in 1934. Upon completion of his LL.B., Alston began practicing at the law firm that would become Alston, Miller and Gaines, where he became a partner in 1942.

From 1942 - 1945, Alston served in the United States Navy, and returned to his legal practice following the end of World War II.

Alston was a confidant of U.S. President Jimmy Carter, and began supporting Carter politically in 1966. In 1976, Alston was chairman of Jimmy Carter's presidential campaign committee. Carter appointed him ambassador to Australia and Nauru in 1977 and 1979, respectively. He served in those roles until 1981.

Following his diplomatic appointments, Alston was a co-founder of the Georgia Foundation, raising millions of dollars for the University of Georgia.

References

1911 births
1988 deaths
University of Georgia alumni
Ambassadors of the United States to Australia
Ambassadors of the United States to Nauru
Emory University School of Law alumni
Georgia (U.S. state) lawyers
20th-century American lawyers
20th-century American diplomats